Walckenaeria spiralis is a species of dwarf spider in the family Linyphiidae. It is found in Russia, Canada, and the United States.

References

Linyphiidae
Articles created by Qbugbot
Spiders described in 1882